Orazio de Ferrari (1606–1657) was an Italian artist, active in the Baroque period, born in Voltri, a suburb of Genoa. de Ferrari was a pupil of Giovanni Andrea Ansaldo.  He was a member of the family of Genoese artists, with surnames de Ferrari, which also included Giovanni Andrea de Ferrari and Gregorio De Ferrari.  During the 17th century, he painted murals in the chapel and many of the state rooms of the Royal Palace in Monaco.

Notes

References 

Prince's Palace of Monaco retrieved 12 February 2007
Artcyclopedia retrieved 12 February 2007

1606 births
1657 deaths
17th-century Italian painters
Italian male painters
Painters from Genoa
Renaissance painters